The Other Side is an album by pianist Tord Gustavsen 's Trio released on the ECM label in 2018.

Reception

Allmusic awarded the album 4 stars and the review by Thom Jurek stated "The Other Side represents a new beginning, one that exists in its own space apart from the larger group outings, but also separate from the previous trio. This group is more inquisitive than assertive -- whether playing one of Gustavsen's seven originals, traditional songs, or the three adaptations of J.S. Bach compositions ... The Other Side offers an expanded version of Gustavsen's trio signature. It retains the elemental articulations of melodic focus that made the previous version unique, but asks far more questions of the material needing to deliver answers, creating a constantly evolving, affirmative body of music".

On PopMatters, John Garratt noted "There's plenty to like in The Other Side 's loose feel in how composition swirls with improvisation. It's also too easy to let it pass you by ... Even when his playing is at its most rapid, Tord Gustavsen still applies a minimal approach that is frightened to wake the baby".

The All About Jazz review by Mike Jurkovic said that "All his compositions on The Other Side bare their secrets slowly and play out their methodically expressionistic hauntings with a gospel-influenced left hand seemingly rooted thousands of miles away in the muddy Louisiana delta ... The Other Side is a warm, whole-cloth adventure of spacious interiors ... Gustavsen freely mixes the ancient music of Norway with his love of Bach, the pianist arranging three chorales for the album; amongst them, the Vespestad-led "Schlafes Bruder" integrates a deep groove that Bach may never have imagined".

Track listing
All compositions by Tord Gustavsen except where noted

Personnel
Tord Gustavsen - piano
Sigurd Hole - bass
Jarle Vespestad - drums

References

ECM Records albums
Tord Gustavsen albums
2018 albums
Albums produced by Manfred Eicher